Dunnsville is an abandoned town in Western Australia located 46 km north-west of Coolgardie  in the Goldfields-Esperance region of Western Australia.

In 1894, gold was discovered in the area by a prospector, John George Dunn F.R.G.S, and the townsite was gazetted on 9 December 1897.

By 1898, the population of the town was 67 (60 males and 7 females).

The original lease later became better known as the Wealth of Nations mine. A coach service operated between the town and Coolgardie.

Between 1894 and 1938, the combined gold production of Dunnsville and the nearby Jaurdi Hills was 28,041 ounces from 45,500 tonnes of ore.

References 

Goldfields-Esperance
Ghost towns in Western Australia